Rui Filipe Dolores Azevedo (born 2 May 1978), known as Dolores, is a Portuguese former footballer who played as a left winger.

He amassed Primeira Liga totals of 152 games and ten goals over the course of six seasons, representing three clubs, mainly Beira-Mar.

Club career
Dolores was born in São João de Ver, Santa Maria da Feira. During his professional career he represented local club C.D. Feirense, S.C. Beira-Mar (two spells, the first ending in January 2004), F.C. Paços de Ferreira, US Créteil-Lusitanos (France, until December 2006), Vitória de Setúbal and Cyprus' Nea Salamis Famagusta FC.

In 2009, Dolores moved to the lower leagues with F.C. Arouca, then signed with amateurs SC São João de Ver at age 31. The following year he joined Boavista FC, with the 2001 Primeira Liga champions in the third division.

External links

1978 births
Living people
Sportspeople from Santa Maria da Feira
Portuguese footballers
Association football wingers
Primeira Liga players
Liga Portugal 2 players
Segunda Divisão players
C.D. Feirense players
S.C. Beira-Mar players
F.C. Paços de Ferreira players
Vitória F.C. players
F.C. Arouca players
SC São João de Ver players
Boavista F.C. players
Académico de Viseu F.C. players
Ligue 2 players
US Créteil-Lusitanos players
Cypriot First Division players
Nea Salamis Famagusta FC players
Portugal youth international footballers
Portugal B international footballers
Portuguese expatriate footballers
Expatriate footballers in France
Expatriate footballers in Cyprus
Portuguese expatriate sportspeople in France
Portuguese expatriate sportspeople in Cyprus